Williams, an electoral district of the Legislative Assembly in the Australian state of New South Wales was created in 1859 and abolished in 1880.


Election results

Elections in the 1870s

1877

1877 by-election

1874

1872

Elections in the 1860s

1869

April 1866 by-election

January 1866 by-election

1864

1860

1860 by-election

Elections in the 1850s

1859

Notes

References

New South Wales state electoral results by district